Otomar Korbelář (3 November 1899 – 30 November 1976) was a Czechoslovak film actor. He appeared in more than 40 films between 1931 and 1976.

Selected filmography
 Grand Hotel Nevada (1935)
 The Lantern (1938)
 Pacientka Dr. Hegla (1940)
 The Hard Life of an Adventurer (1941)
 Experiment (1943)
 Happy Journey (1943)
 The Wedding Ring (1944)
 The Girl from Beskydy Mountains (1944)
 The Adventurous Bachelor (1946)
 The Poacher's Foster Daughter or Noble Millionaire (1949)
 Objev na Střapaté hůrce (1962)
 The Day That Shook the World (1975)

References

External links

1899 births
1976 deaths
Czech male film actors
Male actors from Prague
People from Sázava